Simon Chan may refer to:

 Simon Chan (theologian), Christian theologian
 Simon Chan (director), American music video director